Telecommunications in Rwanda include radio, television, fixed and mobile telephones, and the Internet.

Regulation

Two government-appointed regulatory bodies, the Rwanda Information Technology Authority under the Rwanda Development Board, and the Rwanda Utilities Regulatory Agency (RURA), supervise the regulatory frameworks and implementation of the county's policies and strategies in the telecommunications sector. RURA is a national body with autonomy in its administrative and financial management. However, its seven board members, supervisory board, and the managing director are nominated by and work under full control of the government.

The telecommunications sector was liberalized in 2001, and the number of companies providing telephone and Internet services increased from one, the state-run Rwandatel, to 10 in 2012. These providers are all privately owned, with the exception of Rwandatel. Rwandatel had the largest market share of fixed broadband subscriptions as of September 2012.

Radio and television

 Radio stations:
 Government-owned and operated Radio Rwanda has a national reach; 9 private radio stations; transmissions of multiple international broadcasters are available (2007);
 0 AM, 8 FM, and 1 shortwave stations; two main FM programs are broadcast through a system of repeaters (2005).
 Radios: 601,000 (1997).
 Television stations:
 The government owns and operates the only TV station, Television Rwandaise (2007);
 Two stations (2004).
 Television sets: NA; probably less than 1,000 (1997).

State TV and radio reach the largest audiences, radio is the main source of news, and the international radio stations BBC World Service, Voice of America (VOA), and Deutsche Welle (DW) are available. Most radio stations are accessible online, either through their own websites and blogs, or through social media.

Radio, and in particular the "hate" station Radio Télévision Libre des Mille Collines (RTLM), played a role in the 1994 genocide.

Telephones

 Calling code: +250
 International call prefix: 000
 Main lines:
 11,215 lines in use, 188th in the world (2019)
 Fixed lines subscriptions have dropped sharply since 2014
Airtel Rwanda Ltd controls over 80% of the market
 Mobile cellular: 
9.53 million lines, 90th in the world (2019)
Mobile cellular subscriptions have almost tripled over the past decade
MTN Rwanda Ltd and Airtel Rwanda Ltd split the mobile cellular market roughly 60/40 
 Telephone system: 
 a government-sponsored fiber-optic cable expansion project was completed improving telecommunication services throughout the country (2011); a well-developed mobile cellular network covers nearly 98 percent of the population (2013).
 a small, inadequate telephone system primarily serves business, education, and government; the capital, Kigali, is connected to the centers of the provinces by microwave radio relay and by cellular telephone service; much of the network depends on wire and HF radiotelephone; combined fixed-line and mobile-cellular telephone density has increased and now exceeds 40 telephones per 100 persons, international connections employ microwave radio relay to neighboring countries and satellite communications to more distant countries (2010). 
 Satellite earth stations: 1 Intelsat (Indian Ocean) in Kigali includes telex and telefax service (2010).

Internet

 Top-level domain: .rw
 Internet users: 
 2.65 million, 107th in the world; 21.77% of the population (2018)
 450,000 users (2009), 118th in the world; 
 25,000 users (2002).
 Fixed broadband: 7,501 subscriptions, 175th in the world; less than 1% of population (2018)
 Wireless broadband: 379,331 subscriptions, 99th in the world; 3.2% of the population, 119th in the world (2012).
 Internet hosts: 1,447 hosts, 168th in the world (2012).
 IPv4: 195,840 addresses allocated, 117th in the world, less than 0.05% of the world total, 16.8 addresses per 1000 people (2012).
 Internet Service Providers: 4 ISPs (2005).

Rwanda ranked in first place in Africa for broadband download speeds and 62nd globally with a speed of 7.88 Mbit/s in February 2013.

The Internet has been available from mobile cellular phones since 2007, but the high cost of phones and limited bandwidth restrained its popularity for several years. With completion of the government-sponsored fiber-optic cable expansion project in 2011, telecommunication services throughout the country have improved and the amount of mobile cellular Internet access and use has increased.

In 2009, RURA set up the Rwanda Internet Exchange (RINEX) to connect ISPs and enable the routing of local Internet traffic through a central exchange point without having to pass through international networks. ISPs can also opt to connect via RINEX to the international Internet. As of the end of 2013, only five ISPs exchange Internet traffic via RINEX, and the price for national access remained the same as for international access.

Internet access is limited mostly to Kigali, the capital city, and remains beyond the economic capacity of most citizens, particularly those in rural areas who are limited by low disposable incomes and a low level of digital literacy. More than 90% of the population lives in rural areas, with most engaged in subsistence agriculture. Between 70% and 90% of the population speaks only Kinyarwanda, making Internet content in English unavailable to the majority of Rwandans. In 2015, the Internet penetration rate was about 25% of the population.

Internet censorship and surveillance

Rwanda was rated "partly free" in Freedom on the Net 2013 by Freedom House with a score of 48, somewhat past the midway point between the end of the range for "free" (30) and the start of the range for "not free" (60).

The law does not provide for government restrictions on access to the Internet, but there are reports that the government blocks access to Web sites within the country that are critical of the government.

In 2012 and 2013, some independent online news outlets and opposition blogs were intermittently inaccessible. It is uncertain whether the disruptions are due to government blocking, as was the case in past years, or to technical issues. Some opposition sites continue to be blocked on some ISPs in early 2013, including Umusingi and Inyenyeri News, which were first blocked in 2011. Social-networking sites such as YouTube, Facebook, Twitter, and international blog hosting services are freely available.

The websites of international human rights organizations such as Freedom House, Amnesty International, and Human Rights Watch, as well as the online versions of media outlets such as the BBC, Le Monde, Radio France Internationale, The New York Times, and many others are freely accessible. Websites of national news outlets are also easily accessible. These include the web versions of state-run media and pro-government outlets as well as independent outlets such as The Rwanda Focus, Rushyashya, The Chronicles, Umusanzu, and Rwanda Dispatch.

The constitution provides for freedom of speech and press "in conditions prescribed by the law." The government at times restricts these rights. The government intimidates and arrests journalists who express views that are deemed critical on sensitive topics. Laws prohibit promoting divisionism, genocide ideology, and genocide denial, "spreading rumors aimed at inciting the population to rise against the regime",  expressing contempt for the Head of State, other high-level public officials, administrative authorities or other public servants, and slander of foreign and international officials and dignitaries. These acts or expression of these viewpoints sometimes results in arrest, harassment, or intimidation. Numerous journalists practice self-censorship.

In June 2011 a court convicted journalist Jean Bosco Gasasira in absentia of displaying contempt for the head of state and incitement to civil disobedience for his writings in the online publication Umuvugizi and sentenced him to two and a half years in prison.

The constitution and law prohibit arbitrary interference with privacy, family, home, or correspondence; however, there are numerous reports the government monitors homes, telephone calls, e-mail, Internet chat rooms, other private communications, movements, and personal and institutional data. In some cases monitoring has led to detention and interrogation by State security forces (SSF).

See also 
 Terrestrial fibre optic cable projects in Rwanda
 Media of Rwanda

References

External links
 Rwanda Information Communication and Technology Association (RICTA), manager of the .rw domain.
 Rwanda Broadcasting Agency (RBA), state-owned radio and television broadcaster.